Like Children is an album by Jan Hammer and Jerry Goodman. It was released in 1974 by Nemperor Records. Both musicians were members of the Mahavishnu Orchestra.

Reception

In a review for AllMusic, Michael G. Nastos wrote: "'Country and Eastern Music' and 'Steppings Tones' were high-water marks for this new breed (at the time)."

A writer for Billboard called the album "an exceptional first effort," and commented: "It fully shows their influences on the group's sound as they play every instrument on the album. Each of them is an excellent musician and ably displays it."

Track listing 
 "Country and Eastern Music" (Hammer) – 5:36
 "No Fear" (Hammer) – 3:28
 "I Remember Me" (Hammer) – 3:48
 "Earth (Still Our Only Home)" (Hammer) – 4:16
 "Topeka" (Goodman) – 2:57
 "Steppings Tones" (Rick Laird) – 3:30
 "Night" (Hammer, David Earle Johnson) – 5:48
 "Full Moon Boogie" (Hammer, Goodman) – 4:12
 "Giving in Gently"/"I Wonder" (Hammer, Ivona Reich, Goodman) – 4:43

Personnel
 Jan Hammer - vocals, keyboards, piano (acoustic and electric), Moog synthesizers (lead and bass), sequencing, drums, percussion
 Jerry Goodman - vocals, rhythm, lead and acoustic guitars, violin (electric and acoustic), mandolin (acoustic and electric), viola

References 

1974 albums
Jan Hammer albums
Jerry Goodman albums